The 2001 Southeastern Conference baseball tournament was held at Hoover Metropolitan Stadium in Hoover, Alabama from May 16 through 20.  defeated  in the championship game, earning the Southeastern Conference's automatic bid to the 2001 NCAA Division I baseball tournament.

Regular-season results 
The top two teams (based on conference results) from both the Eastern and Western Divisions earned automatic invites to the tournament. The next four teams with the best conference winning percentages, regardless of division, qualified for the tournament at-large.

Tournament 

 Kentucky, Alabama, Vanderbilt and Arkansas did not make the tournament.

All-Tournament Team 
Most Valuable Player
Chris Young, Mississippi State

See also 
 College World Series
 NCAA Division I Baseball Championship
 Southeastern Conference baseball tournament

References 

 SECSports.com All-Time Baseball Tournament Results
 SECSports.com All-Tourney Team Lists

Tournament
Southeastern Conference Baseball Tournament
Southeastern Conference baseball tournament
Southeastern Conference baseball tournament
College sports tournaments in Alabama
Baseball competitions in Hoover, Alabama